Doom Unit is a Finnish rock band from Tampere. It was formed in late 2008 and became famous since winning Radio Rock's Starba -competition in 2009. The band's first single (entitled "Killing Time") was a huge hit in Finland and also ended up as a theme music for Harper's Island TV-program in Finland.

Career 
Doom Unit released their first studio album "Cross the Line" in 2009, which hit the Finnish Album Chart #2. The follower "The Burden of Bloom" was released in 2011 and third one "III" was out in 2013 and reached #12 in the album chart . Doom Unit is a four-piece bulldozer, leading singer Jape who is also known as famous radio / TV voice. Known of the energic live shows and many radio hits, Doom Unit is back in biz with their latest effort "Underdog" (2015).

Band members 
 Jape Ylinikka - Vocals, Guitars (2008–present)
 Chris Heikkilä - Guitars, Vocals (2008–present)
 Julli Väkevä - Drums (2008–present)
 Kari Luonsinen - Bass (2014–present)

Former members 
 Nahka - Bass (2008–2013)
 AH Haapasalo - Bass (2013–2014)

Discography

Singles
Killing Time (2009)
Chameleon (2009)
Hide Your Scars (2009)
Pile of Bones (2010)
Reckoning Day (2011)
The Cradle and the Grave (2011)
.45 (2014)
Get Away (2013)
Crawler (2014)
Underdog (2015)
Black Day Comes (2019)

Albums
 Cross the Line (2009)
 The Burden of Bloom (2011)
 III (2013)

Music videos
Killing Time (2009)
The Cradle and the Grave (2011)
Get Away (2013)
Underdog (2015)

References

Finnish heavy metal musical groups